Enderly is a historic home located at Charlottesville, Virginia. It was built in 1859–1860, and is a two-story, three bay, Greek Revival style brick dwelling. It has an original one-story rear wing, later expanded to two stories in the 20th century. A single-story Colonial Revival front porch replaced the original portico.

It was listed on the National Register of Historic Places in 1982.

Located at 605 Watson Avenue, adjacent to the Enderly House, is the Enderly kitchen. The kitchen was built in 1858 and prepared all of the meals for the Enderlys. Originally just a two room kitchen, the front 2 over 2 was added during World War I. In 1986, an additional first floor BR suite was added that enlarged the home even more.

References

Houses on the National Register of Historic Places in Virginia
Houses completed in 1860
Greek Revival houses in Virginia
Colonial Revival architecture in Virginia
Houses in Charlottesville, Virginia
National Register of Historic Places in Charlottesville, Virginia